Four polls make up the 2016 NCAA Division I women's soccer rankings, the NSCAA Coaches Poll, the Soccer America Poll, the Top Drawer Soccer Poll, and the Hero Sports soccer poll. They represent the ranking system for the 2016 NCAA Division I women's soccer season.

Legend

NSCAA Coaches

Soccer America

Top Drawer

Hero Sports

References

Rankings
College women's soccer rankings in the United States